
Bomilcar was a Carthaginian nobleman and commander in the Second Punic War (218–201BC).

He was a son-in-law of Hamilcar Barca and the father of the Hanno who commanded a portion of Hannibal's army at the passage of the Rhone (218BC) and at the Battle of Cannae. This Bomilcar seems to have been one of the Carthaginian suffetes and to have presided in that assembly of the senate in which the Second Punic War was resolved upon.

See also
 Other Bomilcars in Carthaginian history
 Melqart, the Canaanite deity

References

Citations

Bibliography
 . 

Carthaginian commanders of the Second Punic War
3rd-century BC Punic people